Adam Gregory Tafralis (born August 30, 1983) is a former professional gridiron football quarterback. He was signed by the Indianapolis Colts as an undrafted free agent in 2008. He played college football at San Jose State University.

He was also a member of the Hamilton Tiger-Cats, Sacramento Mountain Lions and Toronto Argonauts.

Early years
Tafralis attended Mills High School in Millbrae, California where he starred in football, basketball, and track and field. He was the 2002 San Mateo County athlete of the year his senior year.

College career
He played college football at San Jose State, where he was the starting quarterback from the 2004–2007 seasons. This included the 2006 season, where he led the Spartans to the 2006 New Mexico Bowl, and set many records in passing which still remain unsurpassed. Tafralis graduated from San Jose State in December 2007 with a B.S. in kinesiology.

Professional career

Indianapolis Colts
Tafralis was signed by the Indianapolis Colts after going undrafted in 2008. He was later released after not playing, and signed with the Hamilton Tiger-Cats of the Canadian Football League.

Hamilton Tiger-Cats
Tafralis saw his first action on October 24, 2008, throwing a touchdown pass to Prechae Rodriguez late in the 4th quarter of a home game vs. the Calgary Stampeders. On September 18, 2009, he again saw action against Calgary late in the game, throwing a touchdown pass to Arland Bruce III to give the Tiger-Cats the win.

He was cut in April 2011 by the Ticats and became a free agent.

Sacramento Mountain Lions
After his release from Hamilton, Tafralis signed with the United Football League's Sacramento Mountain Lions.

Toronto Argonauts
On February 16, 2012, he was signed to the Toronto Argonauts of the CFL.

On May 30, 2012, he announced his retirement from football.

Personal
His father Gregg, was an Olympic shotputter who competed in the 1992 Olympics, and also held the world title in the early '90s. During the 2010 offseason, Tafralis worked as a trainer for John Paye at Paye's Sports Performance in San Carlos, CA.

References

External links
Toronto Argonauts bio
San José State Spartans bio
College and Pro Statistics at TotalFootballStats.com

1983 births
Living people
People from Daly City, California
Players of American football from California
American football quarterbacks
American players of Canadian football
Canadian football quarterbacks
San Jose State Spartans football players
Indianapolis Colts players
Hamilton Tiger-Cats players
Sacramento Mountain Lions players
Sportspeople from the San Francisco Bay Area
Toronto Argonauts players